The De Tonti Square Historic District is a historic district in the city of Mobile, Alabama, United States. It was placed on the National Register of Historic Places on February 7, 1972. It is a nine-block area, roughly bounded by Adams, St. Anthony, Claiborne, and Conception Streets. It was named in honor of Henri de Tonti and consists mainly of townhouses built between 1840 and 1860. It includes numerous examples of the Federal, Greek Revival, and Italianate architectural styles.

Gallery

References

Historic districts in Mobile, Alabama
National Register of Historic Places in Mobile, Alabama
Neoclassical architecture in Alabama
Greek Revival architecture in Alabama
Federal architecture in Alabama
Historic districts on the National Register of Historic Places in Alabama